Variscourt is a commune in the Aisne department in Hauts-de-France in northern France.

Geography
The commune is traversed by the river Suippe. Aguilcourt—Variscourt halt has rail connections to Reims and Laon.

Politics and administration

Municipal administration

Population

See also
 Communes of the Aisne department

References

Communes of Aisne
Remi
Aisne communes articles needing translation from French Wikipedia